Gilbert McAllister (26 March 1906 – 27 May 1964) was a British Labour Party politician. He unsuccessfully contested the North Lanarkshire constituency in 1935, and came in at second at the 1937 Glasgow Hillhead by-election.

At the 1945 general election McAllister was elected as member of parliament (MP) for Rutherglen.  He held that seat for six years, until his defeat at the 1951 election by the Conservative Party candidate Richard Brooman-White.

References 

United Kingdom general elections results, 1951 at Richard Kimber's Political Science Resources

External links 
 

1906 births
1964 deaths
Scottish Labour MPs
Members of the Parliament of the United Kingdom for Scottish constituencies
UK MPs 1945–1950
UK MPs 1950–1951